Paramarane is a monotypic moth genus in the family Eupterotidae. Its only species, Paramarane pulchra, is found in New Guinea. Both the genus and species were described by George Thomas Bethune-Baker in 1910.

The wingspan is about 51 mm. The forewings are silvery white with a yellow costa and with an oblique waved yellow postmedial line with a finer dark brown central line. The hindwings are uniform golden yellow.

References

Moths described in 1910
Eupterotidae
Monotypic moth genera